Maureen Long may refer to:

 Maureen D. Long, American geophysics professor
 Maureen Long, victim of English serial killer Peter Sutcliffe
 Maureen Johnson (Heinlein character), also known as Maureen Long, character in science fiction novels by American writer Robert A. Heinlein